HMS Kent was a 74-gun third-rate ship of the line of the Royal Navy, launched on 17 January 1798 at Blackwall Yard.

Career

When Kent was launched on 17 January 1798, she was launched immediately after the East Indiaman . Kent followed nearly the same course as Lord Duncan had taken with the result that Kents stern ran into Lord Duncans bow, doing great damage to both vessels. Both vessels then had to go back into dock to effect repairs.

On 9 May 1801 Kent,  and  unsuccessfully chased the French corvette Heliopolis, which eluded them and slipped into Alexandria. Because Kent served in the Navy's Egyptian campaign (8 March to 8 September 1801), her officers and crew qualified for the clasp "Egypt" to the Naval General Service Medal that the Admiralty authorised in 1850 for all surviving claimants.

(The sloops  and  covered the landing.) The landing party destroyed six of eight merchant vessels with supplies for the French army at Barcelona, as well as the vessels' escorts, a national ketch of 14 guns and 60 men and two xebecs of three guns and thirty men each. The vessels were lying inside the mole under the protection of 250 French troops, a battery of two 24-pounders, and a 13" mortar in a battery on a commanding height. Although the attack was successful, the withdrawal was not. The British lost 33 men killed, 89 wounded, and 86 taken prisoner, plus one seaman who took the opportunity to desert.

Fate
Kent became a sheer hulk in 1856, and was broken up in 1881.

Notes and citations
Notes

Citations

References

 
 
 Lavery, Brian (2003) The Ship of the Line - Volume 1: The development of the battlefleet 1650-1850. Conway Maritime Press. .

External links
 

Ships of the line of the Royal Navy
Ajax-class ships of the line
1798 ships
Ships built by the Blackwall Yard